Munna Bhai is an Indian Hindi language film series created, written and directed Rajkumar Hirani and produced by Vidhu Vinod Chopra under Vinod Chopra Productions banner. It consists of Munna Bhai M.B.B.S. released in 2003 and its sequel Lage Raho Munna Bhai in 2006. The films shared same characters of  Sanjay Dutt as Munna Bhai, Arshad Warsi as Circuit in each film with different plot elements and settings. Boman Irani features in each film with different characters. Both of the films received widespread critical acclaim and became huge commercially successful of its time.

Films

Munna Bhai M.B.B.S. (2003) 

Murli Prasad Sharma, nicknamed as "Munna Bhai" ("Bhai" is a word used to address Dons in India, especially Mumbaiyya Maharashtrian region, literally means Brother) is a good-hearted local gangster who engages in criminal activities. Munna Bhai pretends to be a doctor in order to impress his father, but after being revealed as a gangster to his father who feels insulted, he decides to go to a medical college to obtain an M.B.B.S. degree to prove he can become a real doctor. The film follows Munna' extremely well-played struggle as he learns about the medical system and makes his way through the renowned medical college run by dean Dr. Asthana, the very man who insulted his father. He continues to cheat his way through college but changes over time while also instilling a more heartfelt and sensitive approach to patient care in the hospital.

Lage Raho Munna Bhai (2006) 

In the second installment of the series, Munna Bhai poses as a professor of history in order to meet with a radio jockey whose voice he has fallen in love with. She asks him to give a lecture on Mahatma Gandhi, and as a result, he becomes a proponent of Gandhism and uses it to solve modern life problems of the people.

Third Munna Bhai film 
On 25 February 2016, Sanjay Dutt was released from Yerwada Central Jail after completing his sentence (2013–2016) for illegal possession of firearms in 1993. Vidhu Vinod Chopra announced on 29 September 2016 that production on the third Munna Bhai film starring Dutt in the title role may begin in 2017.
But the project got delayed again because Hirani decided to instead work on Sanjay Dutt's biopic, titled Sanju.

In June 2018, Hirani confirmed his future plans for films which included Munna Bhai 3 and he has confirmed to have begun working on story with his co-writer Abhijat Joshi. It will be his next project after Sanju is released.
The shooting of the 3rd instalment on the Munna Bhai series was going to start in June 2019 but got delayed to October 2020 due to the COVID-19 pandemic.

Short film

Munna Bhai Chale America (2007) 
After the success of the first two films, Rajkumar Hirani and Vidhu Vinod Chopra planned to make a third film titled Munna Bhai Chale America. The short film was released in 2007 as an announcement teaser which followed the characters of Munna Bhai and Circuit learning English.
But the project got nowhere and the idea was cancelled altogether after Sanjay Dutt's conviction and subsequent imprisonment.
Now in 2018 after the release of "Sanju", Rajkumar Hirani says that he will start the films very soon.

Cast and characters

Release and revenue

Awards

Munna Bhai M.B.B.S. 
Munna Bhai M.B.B.S. was the recipient of a number of awards. At the 2004 Filmfare awards, it received the Filmfare Critics Award for Best Movie, the Filmfare Best Screenplay Award, the Filmfare Best Dialogue Award, and the Filmfare Best Comedian Award in addition to four other nominations. It won a number of awards at the 2004 Zee Cine Awards including Best Debuting Director, Zee Cine Award for Best Actor in a Comic Role, Best Cinematography, and Best Dialogue.

Other ceremonies include the 2004 National Film Awards where it won the National Film Award for Best Popular Film and the 2004 International Indian Film Academy Awards where it won the IIFA Best Comedian Award.

Lage Raho Munna Bhai 

Lage Raho Munna Bhai is the  recipient of four National Film Awards in addition to other awards. Some speculated that it would represent India as an entry for the 2007 Academy Award for Best Foreign Film.  Although ultimately losing to Rang De Basanti as India's official submission, the producers submitted it as an independent entry. However, neither film received an Oscar nomination.

References 

Indian film series
Comedy film series